Home and Away is an Australian television soap opera. It was first broadcast on the Seven Network on 17 January 1988. The following is a list of characters that appeared in 2018, by order of first appearance. All characters are introduced by the soap's executive producer, Lucy Addario. The 31st season of Home and Away began airing from 29 January 2018. Dean Thompson and Colby Thorne were introduced during February. April saw the first appearances of Lance Salisbury and Ebony Harding, while Ty Anderson made his debut in May. September saw the arrival of Chelsea Campbell. Dean's mother Karen Thompson was introduced in October. Simone Bedford and Bella Nixon began appearing from November.

Dean Thompson

Dean Thompson, played by Patrick O'Connor, made his first appearance on 1 February 2018. O'Connor began filming five months prior to his casting announcement on 13 January 2018. He had previously auditioned for other Home and Away characters, and came close to securing the roles, before being cast as Dean. This is O'Connor's first acting role. Of his casting, he stated "Home and Away is obviously known as a launch pad for many actors’ careers. Obviously going into the type of role that this is, being a River Boy and there being a story there already that is so big and well known, it means there is a legacy there to play around with and being a bad boy on the show is exciting." Dean is a member of the show's River Boys group, who were introduced in 2011 with the arrival of the Braxton brothers. Dean was branded "the new bad boy of Summer Bay" by Jonathon Moran of The Daily Telegraph. While O'Connor described him as "cheeky" and said that he loves AFL. The actor added that he likes that his character has tattoos, as he has always wanted one.

Colby Thorne

Colby Thorne, played by Tim Franklin, made his first appearance on 6 February 2018. Franklin's casting was confirmed in December 2017, after he was photographed filming scenes at Palm Beach, the show's outdoor filming location. He learned from his agent that he had secured the role of Colby on his 27th birthday. He stated, "My agent sang 'Happy Birthday', but changed my name to Colby. When I heard it, I jumped out of my seat and screamed – it was the best gift." Colby is a police constable. Franklin said Colby's "turbulent upbringing" led him to join the force. He also told Tamara Cullen of TV Week, "I believe that any character has to come from a reality within myself. We've both had traumas and heartache in our past – as we all have – so I try to bring as much of myself to the role." Colby is a former member of the River Boys surf gang, and a love interest for Jasmine Delaney (Sam Frost).

Lance Salisbury

Lance Salisbury, played by Angus McLaren, made his first appearance on 17 April 2018. McLaren's casting and character details were announced on 16 April 2018. Of joining the cast, McLaren commented, "It's very exciting. It hit home for me when I walked into the Diner and all the characters I've grown up watching were there." McLaren was reunited with his former Packed to the Rafters co-star James Stewart, who plays Justin Morgan. Lance is a federal agent and best friend of Robbo (Jake Ryan). Lance is involved with the circumstances surrounding Robbo's amnesia and he helps out as the "mystery slowly gets unpacked." Lance also wants his friend to get justice. The character returned the following year.

After Robbo is brought in to an AFP base, Lance helps him to recall his memories and identity. Lance explains that Robbo's real name is Ryan Shaw and that he is a federal agent, whose family were killed when he began investigating corruption in the force. Robbo went undercover as Beckett Reid and he was sent to Summer Bay to protect Kat Chapman (Pia Miller). The federal police were unsure whether Robbo's amnesia was real or not, so they did not intervene. Lance drives Robbo back to Summer Bay and tells him that all the charges against him have been dropped. He also returns all of Robbo's belongings, including his birth certificate, passport, driver's licence and credit cards. Lance advises Robbo to think about returning to the AFP before he leaves. Robbo calls Lance, but he remains reluctant to accept his offer to rejoin. Lance and Robbo team up to investigate a smuggling operation, but Robbo has to retrain and Lance informs him that he needs to pass a psych evaluation. Robbo refuses and Lance suggests that he becomes an instructor instead, but Robbo soon realises that he no longer wants to do police work. Robbo later contacts Lance to ask him to run a background check on Ebony Harding (Cariba Heine).

Lance returns to the Bay for Robbo's pre-wedding dinner at Salt, after being invited by Colby Thorne (Tim Franklin). He meets Robbo's fiancée Jasmine Delaney (Sam Frost) and he and Robbo both notice that something is bothering her. On the day of the wedding, Lance receives a call and later tells Robbo that his parents will not make the ceremony due to car trouble. Lance continues to check his phone and later asks Colby Thorne to identify a guest outside the church. After allowing Robbo and Jasmine to enjoy a moment of their wedding reception, Lance and other AFP officers move in to take the couple into protective custody. They, along with Tori Morgan who is carrying Robbo's child, are taken to a safe house, where Lance explains that the people who killed Robbo's family are back. Robbo and Jasmine decide to return to the Bay, and Lance deputises Robbo back into the AFP. Lance stays with Tori at the safe house, until he decides to go back into the field. He assures her that Scott Larkin (Trent Baines) is trustworthy, and that he will do his best to get her home to her family. Lance is later murdered by Ouroboros Gang as a message to Robbo to stop him from testifying

Ebony Harding

Ebony Harding (also Easton), played by Cariba Heine, made her first appearance on 19 April 2018. The character and Heine's casting was confirmed during a trailer which aired before the show's break for the 2018 Commonwealth Games. Heine sent a taped audition to the casting directors while she was overseas. Weeks later, she learnt via email that she had secured the role of Ebony. Ebony was introduced as the show's new villain, who wants revenge on some of the residents of Summer Bay. She is connected with the kidnapping of Justin Morgan's (James Stewart) daughter Ava Gilbert (Grace Thomas). Eliza Velk of Yahoo7 Be speculated that Ebony also has a connection to criminal Boyd Easton (Steve Le Marquand) and commented, "Either way something bad is brewing in the bay." Heine later said that she was excited to play a villain, adding "She's pretty despicable, so I hope she gets a rise out of people!"

Ebony goes to Northern Districts Hospital and pretends to be a doctor, after learning her brother Boyd Easton has been brought in. After over hearing that her brother has died, she goes to see her mother, Hazel Easton (Genevieve Lemon) and they both swear revenge on the people who are responsible for Boyd's death. Ebony comes to Summer Bay and begins trying to get to know Colby Thorne (Tim Franklin), the police constable who shot Boyd. She slashes her car tyre, hoping Colby will help her change it, but he has to leave and Hunter King (Scott Lee) helps out. Hazel tells her to hurry up and make everyone pay, but Ebony replies that she wants to have some fun and plans to go after Willow Harris (Sarah Roberts) and Justin Morgan too. Hazel continues to doubt Ebony's plan. Ebony brings her car to Justin's business Summer Bay Auto for a service, and later stages a car crash, hoping to discredit the garage. Ebony threatens to sue Justin for $100,000 for her neck injury and loss of potential earnings. Justin offers her a $30,000 settlement, which she accepts. He also gets her a job at his brother's restaurant, Salt. Ebony breaks into Colby's apartment and learns he has a younger sister. She continues to bond with Colby, before sabotaging his relationship with Jasmine Delaney (Sam Frost).

Ebony learns Colby was a member of the River Boys gang and leaks the story to the newspapers. She also takes a photo of Colby with fellow River Boy Dean Thompson (Patick O'Connor), which results in Colby's suspension from the police force. Ebony starts manipulating Colby's friendship with his housemate Robbo (Jake Ryan) by suggesting that Robbo might be trying to set Colby up. Ebony flirts with Robbo and tries to question him about Colby, before kissing him. Robbo makes it clear that he is interested in Ebony romantically and she accepts his invitation to a lunch date. Hazel moves into Ebony's motel room and gives her two vials of poison. Hazel tells Ebony to kill Robbo, as well as Colby. Ebony poisons Robbo's drink during lunch, but when he opens up about the death of his partner, she takes his glass and pours the drink away, unable to go through with killing him. Ebony sees Colby fighting with Dean and calls the police, leading them to fire Colby from his job.

Ebony plants her burner phone in Willow's caravan and when Colby finds Willow and Dean with the phone, their relationship is strained. Ebony realises that Robbo is becoming suspicious of her, and she later learns he is having her investigated. Ebony steals medication from the hospital and then knocks Colby out. When he wakes, Ebony explains who she is and then injects him with a muscle relaxant, which will soon stop him breathing. Ebony calls the police and sends them to her motel room by pretending she is a concerned guest. When they arrive, they find Robbo with Hazel's body. Ebony leaves the Bay, believing she has killed Colby and framed Robbo. Robbo is charged with Hazel's murder, while Colby is found in time. After he returns home, Ebony contacts him via an online chat room and pretends to be his sister. She lures Colby to a house in the bush, where she locks him inside a room and pours gasoline around the door. Robbo tries to talk her out of setting it alight and he catches her lighter, as she runs outside. The police arrive and arrest her.

Ty Anderson

Ty Anderson, played by Darius Williams, made his first appearance on 7 May 2018. The character and casting details were announced in the 21–27 April 2018 issue of Inside Soap. Williams was contracted for six months. He began filming his guest stint from October 2017. Actor Ray Meagher (Alf Stewart) confirmed that the producers would be introducing a gay character during a February 2018 interview. He stated, "Our writers do try to keep abreast with the times, so there is an interesting character coming in. I won't tell you too much more about him, about how he works out or what happens, but that is being addressed." Ty is the first gay character to be introduced to Home and Away since 2009, when the show featured a same-sex relationship between Charlie Buckton (Esther Anderson) and Joey Collins (Kate Bell), which was criticised by conservative groups and parents. Ty is fostered by John Palmer (Shane Withington) and Marilyn Chambers (Emily Symons). He also befriends Raffy Morrison (Olivia Deeble) during his time in Summer Bay. Following his character's departure on 15 August 2018, Williams wrote on his social media account, "I hope Ty's complex, contemporary and powerful story is one remembered fondly. Thank you everyone who watched and enjoyed." Williams said he would like to return, as there were many storylines to explore with Ty.

After his grandfather gets sick, Ty's case worker brings him to Summer Bay to stay with John Palmer and Marilyn Chambers. Ty refuses the food on offer, as he has already eaten, and later goes out on his own for a walk. Ty appears disinterested during a talk about his new school, leading Raffy Morrison to call him out for being rude to everyone. When Ty tells her that he does not plan on staying long and will be gone when he turns sixteen, Raffy tells him to leave. Ty befriends Ryder Jackson (Lukas Radovich) when they pair up for an assignment during Ty's first day at school. Raffy accuses Ty of taking advantage of John and Marilyn, while he counters that she is jealous of not being the focus of all their attention. When Raffy sees Ty throwing away the packed lunch Marilyn prepared for him, she confronts him again about his ungrateful attitude towards the Palmers. Ty tells her that they will never love her like their own child and Raffy slaps him. Roo Stewart (Georgie Parker) ask them to apologise to each other, but they refuse and Ty walks out of the office. Raffy later finds him on the beach and apologises for slapping him. She asks him if they can have a fresh start and they finally bond, with Ty vowing to make more of an effort with the Palmers.

Ty stands up for Raffy when another student purposely bumps her, making her drop her money. They continue to get on well, until she asks to listen to his music and they argue again. Ty later decides to share his music with her. While Raffy is listening to one of his newer tracks, Ty kisses her and she kisses him back. John and Raffy's brother Justin Morgan (James Stewart) walk in on them and Justin orders Raffy to move home. Ty apologises to John and Marilyn for jeopardising their chance at fostering. Ty later meets Raffy at the beach and they kiss again. They start dating. Ty's friendship with Ryder grows when he helps Ryder out at the juice bar. While helping Coco Astoni (Anna Cocquerel) to plan her sister's wedding, Ty invites Ryder to listen to his latest song. Ty then tells Ryder that he likes him, before attempting to kiss him. Ryder asks Ty to meet him the following day to talk. Ty initially says that he mistook Ryder for Raffy, as he was tired. Ryder tells him it is okay if he is gay, but Ty reacts angrily and physically pushes Ryder away several times. Ty refuses to speak to John, and later takes all his belongings and leaves. Ty falls down an embankment in the bush, and injures his head and ankle. He manages to call Ryder, who sends John and Alf Stewart to help rescue him. In the hospital, Ty admits to John and Marilyn that he is gay, and asks them to talk to Raffy, who reacts angrily when she believes Ty was just using her.

Ty attempts to make amends with Raffy, but she plans to move back in with her family. Raffy later tells Ty that he made her feel like the problem in their relationship. Ty apologises, and explains that he was confused and realises he should not have strung her along. Raffy is teased about her break-up with Ty by another student at school, which leads Ty to out himself in her defence. He then suffers a panic attack, and tells John and Marilyn that he does not want to return to school. Coco, Raffy and Ryder decide that they will stay with Ty if he is not going back to school, but when they are threatened with detention, Coco suggests they all go in together. Ty notices the other students talking about him, so Ryder takes Ty into the school office and plays one of Ty's songs over the PA system. The other students enjoy the music and give him a round of applause when he emerges. Ty celebrates his 16th birthday and his mother Jodi Anderson (Sara Zwangobani) asks to see him, but Ty decides that he does not want to meet her, as he is worried that she will not accept him. Jodi comes to the Bay and Marilyn encourages Ty to give his mum a chance. Jodi explains to Ty that his grandparents kept her away from him, and she should have tried harder to see him. After telling Jodi about his sexuality, Ty decides to leave the Bay with her.

Chelsea Campbell

Chelsea Campbell, played by Ashleigh Brewer, made her first appearance on 18 September 2018. Brewer's casting and character details were announced on 31 March 2018. Brewer was in Los Angeles when she learned about the role, and she filmed an audition to send over to the Home and Away producers. After recording a second tape and sending it over, she learned that she had secured the role. The actress was initially contracted for six months. Of joining the show, Brewer stated "I'm so excited about it. The character in particular is great and the storyline is fantastic. I'm very excited to dive into a show that is so long-standing and one that I know very well." Brewer declined the producers' offer to extend her contract, as she had plans to move into a new home with her boyfriend in Los Angeles.

Chelsea is a police senior constable, who has a connection to one of the established characters. Brewer commented that Chelsea would give the character "a real shock..." She also called her character "extremely nice with a strong head on her shoulders", but added that Chelsea would cause some trouble. A writer for TV Soap dubbed Chelsea a "sassy cop", and thought Brewer's casting was "a terrific shot in the arm for Home and Away."

Chelsea is shown around the Summer Bay Caravan Park by Alf Stewart (Ray Meagher). She attracts the attention of Dean Thompson (Patrick O'Connor), who makes romantic advances towards her, but she rejects him. Chelsea comes face to face with her former boyfriend Colby Thorne at the Yabbie Creek Police Station and she informs him that she has been transferred, but Colby refuses to talk with her. Chelsea later arrests Dean for refusing to leave a property. She and Colby talk about their break up due to his affiliation with the River Boys gang. Chelsea asks him if he still loves her, and gives him her engagement ring, but Colby asks her to leave the Bay. They later kiss, but Colby refuses to say whether he still has feelings for Chelsea. He later asks her to stop bringing up their past. Sergeant Phillip McCarthy (Nicholas Cassim) learns Chelsea and Colby used to date. He tells them they will be working together and warns them that if they do not act professionally, then one of them will have to leave. Chelsea learns that teens Raffy Morrison (Olivia Deeble), Ryder Jackson (Lukas Radovich) and Coco Astoni (Anna Cocquerel) have gone missing. She and Colby follow Dean to an abandoned house and Chelsea crawls through a fallen tunnel to get to an injured Raffy. Colby admits that he was worried about Chelsea's safety and kisses her, but she leaves. She later kisses him back and they reconcile their relationship, agreeing to work through their issues together.

Colby tells Chelsea that Dean went to prison for him, after they were involved in a fatal car accident. Their relationship is strained, as she realises that she has to hide another of his secrets. Colby gives her back the engagement ring, and after Chelsea discusses Colby's history in the River Boys with Willow, she asks Colby to propose to her properly. Chelsea calls her father Neil Campbell (Steve Nation) to tell him about the engagement and leaves him a voicemail. He then comes to the Bay and makes his disapproval of Colby clear. He asks Colby to give Chelsea up in exchange for information about his missing sister Bella Nixon (Courtney Miller), but Colby refuses. Chelsea then learns that her mother and sister will not come to the wedding. After Colby discovers that his stepfather Ross Nixon (Justin Rosniak) killed his parents, Chelsea begs Neil to send her Ross's address, which he does via text message. She later realises that Colby saw the message and has gone to get his sister. Chelsea ends the engagement and puts in a transfer application. Bella meets with Chelsea to ask her to talk to Colby. Chelsea tells Colby about the transfer and says goodbye to him. As she is driving out of Summer Bay, Colby catches up to her and gets her to pull over. Colby refuses to let her leave and tells her that he will fight for her. Colby, Chelsea and Bella take a trip away for a few days. On their return, they reveal that they are moving to the city. When Chelsea is accepted onto a detective course, she and Colby bring the wedding forward and they marry in Mangrove River.

Chelsea, Willow and Bella are kidnapped by Ross at gunpoint and he lures Colby into the bush, where he tries to shoot him. Willow is hit by the bullet and Chelsea tends to her, as Colby and Dean go after Ross. They eventually return to the Bay and explain that Ross got away, but Chelsea has doubts about their story. Colby later tells her that he shot Ross dead. Chelsea moves out to the caravan park, and later tells Colby that she cannot live with what he did. She gives him back her engagement and wedding rings, and leaves for the city. Chelsea sends Colby divorce papers the following year.

Karen Thompson

Karen Thompson, played by Georgia Adamson, made her first appearance on 4 October 2018. The character and Adamson's casting details were announced on 24 September 2018. Karen is Dean Thompson's (Patrick O'Connor) mother. She is being introduced in a bid to explore the character's backstory. Jackie Brygel of New Idea reported that Karen has "a history of violence as well as drug and alcohol abuse". She has never been "a stabilising influence" in Dean's life, and her appearance shows that she has not changed. After Dean attempts to talk to her on the phone, Karen "callously" ends the call. Dean then "goes off the rails" and begins drinking. His friend Willow Harris (Sarah Roberts) sees the call to Karen on Dean's phone and realises why he is acting that way. O'Connor said "Things take a bit of a wild turn when Dean's mum, Karen, arrives in the Bay." Daniel Kilkelly of Digital Spy branded Karen "wayward" and "irresponsible".

Dean contacts his mother to tell her that he is going to court, but she hangs up on him. Dean repeatedly calls Karen, but she does not pick up. He visits her home and watches as she reads a note he has left for her, before screwing it up and going back inside with a man. Karen comes to Summer Bay and follows Dean's friend Willow Harris (Sarah Roberts) to Justin Morgan's (James Stewart) house. Karen helps herself to some wine and assumes Willow is in the shower with Dean. Justin goes to find Dean, while Willow stays with Karen. After learning that Dean is working in a garage, Karen tells him she is proud of him. Karen loses her temper at Willow and demands another bottle of wine. She also shouts at John Palmer (Shane Withington) when Dean attempts to explain his absence from community service, and later attempts to run John down in her car. She crashes the car and injures her head. Karen refuses to see a psychiatrist, so Dean takes her to his caravan. Karen propositions Dean's friend Colby Thorne (Tim Franklin) when he comes to take her statement. Karen leaves the Bay after flagging down a passing motorist.

Upon her return, her behaviour continues to be erratic and she spirals out of control. She strikes Dean with a frying pan, knocking him unconscious and leaves the gas on before falling asleep. They are soon found by Willow. Karen leaves the hospital and Dean finds her on the beach, where he explains that she needs help. Karen breaks down completely and in a rage she claims that she has always hated her son, words which Dean ignores as he allows the police to take Karen away. Weeks later, Dean and Colby visit Karen, who has been diagnosed with schizoaffective disorder, and Karen apologises to Dean for what she said to him. Colby tries to ask Karen about his stepfather, Ross Nixon (Justin Rosniak), but she does not want to speak about him. She then reveals that Colby's mother, Michelle, is dead. Weeks later, Willow signs Karen out for the day, so she can speak with Dean. Karen says that she knows Ross turned up, and Dean and Colby got into some trouble. Dean tells her that Colby shot and killed Ross. He also says that he cannot stop thinking about it and has been having nightmares. Karen makes Dean promise her that he will seek help.

Karen returns to the Bay and befriends Ben Astoni (Rohan Nichol) at the caravan park, while she waits for Dean. She tells her son that she has been discharged from the hospital and plans to stay with him. Over dinner, Dean tells Karen that he knows his father is Rick Booth (Mark Lee) and that he tracked him down. Karen explains that they had a drunken one-night stand and he rejected her when he learned of her pregnancy, as his wife was also pregnant. Colby's sister Bella Nixon (Courtney Miller) reveals Dean is in a relationship with Ziggy Astoni (Sophie Dillman), and Karen questions Dean as to why he is keeping secrets from her. Karen soon meets Ziggy and learns Ben is her father. She and Dean are invited to dinner at The Farmhouse, where she upsets Maggie Astoni (Kestie Morassi) when she asks why Ben is not living at home. Karen attempts to find a job and asks at the Diner and then Salt, where she meets the new owner Mackenzie Booth (Emily Weir). Dean reveals that she is Rick's daughter and his half-sister. Karen realises Dean has been lying to her and tries to leave town, but Mackenzie finds her and explains that Rick abandoned her and her mother too. She tried to get revenge on Rick and she and Karen bond. Karen returns to Salt with Mackenzie, where she realises that Dean did not think that she could handle the truth and they make up. Mackenzie gives Karen a waitressing job at Salt, but Karen struggles with the ordering system. While serving a large table, Karen accidentally bumps into John Palmer, starting an argument. She pours a drink over his head and then faints, which Dean thinks she is faking, but it turns out to be a side effect of her medication. She and Dean make up and Karen gets a job in nearby Reefton Lakes.

Simone Bedford

Simone Bedford, played by Emily Eskell, made her first appearance on 15 November 2018. Prior to securing the part of Simone, Eskell had auditioned for the show several times since her graduation from the National Institute of Dramatic Art in 2013. She felt that she was in with a good chance of getting the role upon receiving the brief. She explained, "Usually they [the character briefs] come to me and I'm like, 'Oh, I'm not your super-typical Aussie Home And Away gal'. I've always found it hard to get work in Australia because of that." Home and Away marks Eskell's first major television role.

Simone was introduced as a potential love interest for Brody Morgan (Jackson Heywood), who is married. Eskell told Jackie Brygel of New Idea that Simone is a special-needs teacher, who loves cooking and wants to pursue it as a career, believing that it could be "her new lease on life." The actress added that her character has "a good heart" and is both gentle and "well-intentioned". Simone grows closer to Brody after winning a cooking lesson at an auction. Eskell commented, "Simone comes to Summer Bay because she hears what an amazing chef Brody is. She can't wait to begin working with him. She has sort of a 'career crush' on Brody." As Simone and Brody get started on her lesson, his wife Ziggy Astoni (Sophie Dillman) watches them and sees Simone flirting with Brody. Simone and Brody later have an affair, which ends Brody's marriage to Ziggy, and he and Simone leave the Bay together.

Simone enters the winning bid at a charity auction for a cooking lesson with chef Brody Morgan. Simone flirts with Brody and later meets his wife Ziggy Astoni. The lesson and a subsequent cooking challenge goes well, leading Brody to hire Simone for a one-month trial at Salt. Brody and Simone bond over their love of cooking, and she helps him out with prep work when the restaurant get busy. Simone overhears Ziggy making fun of her and blaming her for Brody cancelling lunch plans. Ziggy apologises and Brody assures Simone that she is doing well. Simone accidentally locks herself and Brody in the store cupboard, and he helps to calm her down when she gets claustrophobic. They are found by Ziggy and Brody's brother, Justin Morgan (James Stewart). Simone tells Brody that their relationship is purely professional, after he speaks with her at Ziggy's request. Ziggy attempts to set Simone up with Mason Morgan (Orpheus Pledger), but they are not interested in each other, so she tries befriending her instead. Ziggy finds a picture of Brody on Simone's phone, which Simone apologises for. Later that day, Brody tells Simone that she cannot work at Salt any longer, as he needs to put his marriage first. Simone then kisses him. Brody says the kiss should not have happened and asks Simone to finish up at Salt. He later gives her a job reference and admits his feelings for her.

Simone returns a couple of weeks later and helps Brody out at the restaurant. They have sex, but she is angry to learn that he is still married. However, she decides that she wants to stay in Summer Bay and begins an affair with Brody. Ziggy discovers Simone is back and Brody explains that her city job fell through and he is rehiring her for a while. Brody tells Simone that he loves Ziggy, but he wants to be with her. Justin learns of the affair and asks Simone to quit her job and leave. Simone struggles to see Brody and Ziggy together and quits the restaurant. She gets a job at the local high school as a learning support teacher to Bella Nixon (Courtney Miller) and Raffy Morrison (Olivia Deeble). Ziggy confronts Simone about her agenda for staying in the Bay, leading to Simone asking Brody to stay away from her. Brody later declares his love for Simone and vows to leave Ziggy after her 21st birthday for her. However, Ziggy catches them together in Simone's caravan, which leads to the end of Brody's marriage. Simone continues working at the school alongside Ziggy's mother Maggie Astoni (Kestie Morassi), but Raffy refuses to have her as a tutor. Simone and Brody face anger from the Astonis, Raffy and Mason when they go public with their relationship. The Morgans also disapprove when she stays the night with Brody at the cottage where he lived with Ziggy. Brody suggests they move in together somewhere else. After they are rejected for a rental agreement due to Brody's criminal record, he tells Simone about his past drug addiction. She asks that they slow things down and get to know one another. Simone is embarrassed when her office door is graffitied with the word "homewrecker", and is upset to learn that it was Bella, who apologises. Simone resigns and she and Brody decide to leave the Bay together. Brody puts Salt up for sale, while Simone finds a new job. Simone helps organise Raffy's 16th birthday party, but she is upset when Ziggy's sister, Coco Astoni (Anna Cocquerel) tells her and Brody that they do not deserve happiness. She plans to leave the Bay without Brody, who has been having doubts about selling Salt. Simone and Brody sell Salt and they move to Yarra Valley together. Two years later, Simone and Brody call Tori and Justin to let them know that they are expecting their first child.

Bella Nixon

Bella Nixon, played by Courtney Miller, made her first appearance on 26 November 2018. Miller's casting was confirmed in September, while her character has been referrered to several times on-screen. Miller previously appeared in the serial as an extra when she was 15. Bella is the long-lost, younger sister of Colby Thorne (Tim Franklin). Colby has been searching for her and her father Ross Nixon (Justin Rosniak) for a number of years. When Colby comes face-to-face with his sister again, "a traumatised" Bella threatens him with a crossbow. Miller explained, "Colby is absolutely the enemy to Bella. She has no idea how destructive her father has been in what he's told her about Colby. She's terrified, but puts on a front." Miller also told Jackie Brygel of New Idea that she loved playing Bella, saying "she is ultimately a troubled child due to her upbringing". Miller received a nomination for the Logie Award for Most Popular New Talent in 2019.

Others

References

External links
Characters and cast at the Official AU Home and Away website
Characters and cast at the Internet Movie Database

, 2018
, Home and Away
2018 in Australian television